Fibulia ramosa, or the columnar sponge, is a species of deep-sea demosponge from the southern hemisphere.

Description 
The columnar sponge grows upright, made up by somewhat fused pale orange-brown column branches. These may become curved or twisted. The surface is covered by small cone-like projections and has a sandpapery texture. The sponge is a firm, tough and leathery structure.

Distribution and habitat 
This species is found of the coasts of south-western Africa, as well as off the Prince Edward Islands. It is known to be one of the most common sponge species off the West Coast of South Africa, where it has been found growing on soft sediments. It has, however, also been found growing on holdfasts in kelp forests.

References 

Demospongiae